I Love Dick is an American television series released on Amazon Prime Video.  It is based on the novel of the same name by Chris Kraus. It was created by Joey Soloway and Sarah Gubbins. The pilot premiered on August 19, 2016, and the first season was released on May 12, 2017. On January 17, 2018, the series was canceled after one season.

Plot
Chris (Kathryn Hahn) is an unsuccessful New York City-based artist and filmmaker who accompanies her husband Sylvère (Griffin Dunne) to Marfa, Texas where Sylvère is taking up a research fellowship.  Upon arrival in Marfa, Chris quickly becomes infatuated with Sylvère's fellowship sponsor Dick (Kevin Bacon).  Her infatuation with Dick becomes articulated in un-delivered letters to him which are filled with unbounded sexually explicit desires.  Her contentious and frustrating interactions with Dick as well as the writing of her confessional letters to him begin to affect her attitudes towards her marriage, work and confidence as an artist and person.

Cast

Main
 Kathryn Hahn as Chris Kraus
 Kevin Bacon as Dick
 Griffin Dunne as Sylvère Lotringer
 Roberta Colindrez as Devon
 Lily Mojekwu as Paula

Recurring
 Bobbi Menuez as Toby
 Sebastian Cole as Lawrence
 Erik Alvarez as Sonny
 Leo Lungaro as Rod
 Rochelle Robinson as Helen

Episodes

Reception

Critical response
I Love Dick has been met with generally positive reviews from critics. The review aggregation website Rotten Tomatoes gives the series an approval rating of 88%, based on 57 reviews, with an average rating of 7.77/10. The site's critical consensus reads, "Adult in the best way, I Love Dick expands the scope of its source material while offering smart, provocative, and funny observations on sexuality and gender roles." Metacritic awarded season one a score of 73 based on 29 critics, denoting "generally favorable" reviews.

Awards and nominations

Notes

References

External links
 

2016 American television series debuts
2017 American television series endings
2010s American comedy-drama television series
English-language television shows
Amazon Prime Video original programming
Television series by Amazon Studios
Marfa, Texas
Television series based on American novels